Anastasiya Dabizha (died 1703), was a princess of Moldavia and Wallachia and a Hetmana of Ukraine by marriage to George Ducas, Prince of Moldavia, Prince of Wallachia, and Hetman of Ukraine (r. 1681-1685).

She was daughter of Dafina Catrina, princess-consort of Moldova, by her first husband the Grand Treasurer Dumitry Buhus. When widowed, Dafina Catrina then married Anastasia's stepfather, Eustratie Dabija, whom the family made Prince of Moldavia in 1661. 

Anastasiya Dabizha is known for her love life, as she had a number of lovers, notably Șerban Cantacuzino, prince of wallachia in 1678-88, which was reported as scandals in contemporary annals. She was also a political supporter of her spouse, and managed to secure a great loan to finance his power as hetman in Ukraine.

References

 Чухліб Т. Гетьмани і монархи. Українська держава в міжнародних відносинах 1648–1714 рр. — К. — Нью-Йорк, 2003.
 Подарунок українській історії від сонячної Молдови
  Anastasia Duca

1703 deaths
17th-century Ukrainian people
People from the Cossack Hetmanate
17th-century Romanian people
Royal consorts of Moldavia
Royal consorts of Wallachia
18th-century Romanian women